Sukarno or Soekarno (born Koesno Sosrodihardjo, ; 6 June 1901 – 21 June 1970) was an Indonesian statesman, orator, revolutionary, and nationalist who was the first president of Indonesia, serving from 1945 to 1967.

Sukarno was the leader of the Indonesian struggle for independence from the Dutch colonialists. He was a prominent leader of Indonesia's nationalist movement during the colonial period and spent over a decade under Dutch detention until released by the invading Japanese forces in World War II. Sukarno and his fellow nationalists collaborated to garner support for the Japanese war effort from the population, in exchange for Japanese aid in spreading nationalist ideas. Upon Japanese surrender, Sukarno and Mohammad Hatta declared Indonesian independence on 17 August 1945, and Sukarno was appointed president. He led the Indonesian resistance to Dutch re-colonisation efforts via diplomatic and military means until the Dutch recognition of Indonesian independence in 1949.

After a chaotic period of parliamentary democracy, Sukarno established an autocratic system called "Guided Democracy" in 1959 that successfully ended the instability and rebellions which were threatening the survival of the diverse and fractious country. In the early 1960s Sukarno embarked on a series of aggressive foreign policies under the rubric of anti-imperialism and personally championed the Non-Aligned Movement. These developments led to increasing friction with the West and closer relations with the USSR. After the events surrounding the 30 September Movement of 1965, the military general Suharto largely took control of the country in a Western-backed military overthrow of the Sukarno-led government. This was followed by repression of real and perceived leftists, including executions of Communist party members and suspected sympathisers in several massacres with support from the CIA and British intelligence services, resulting in an estimated 500,000 to over 1,000,000 deaths. In 1967, Suharto officially assumed the presidency, replacing Sukarno, who remained under house arrest until his death in 1970.

Name
The name was derived from a hero in the Mahabharata Hindu epic, Karna. His father, being from Indonesia, was inspired by Indian historical heroes and Hindu culture, and was so deeply influenced by Karna that he named his son as Sukarno. Su(good)+ Karna or "The good Karna". Karna was a main hero of the great epic Mahabharata, and Sukarno's father projected him to grow up a brave person like Karna, become Daanveer for his subjects, savior or the messiah for his people and a king like Karna. The spelling Soekarno, based on Dutch orthography, is still in frequent use, mainly because he signed his name in the old spelling. Sukarno himself insisted on a "u" in writing, not "oe", but said that he had been told in school to use the Dutch style, and that after 50 years, it was too difficult to change his signature, so still spelled his signature with "oe". Official Indonesian presidential decrees from the period 1947–1968, however, printed his name using the 1947 spelling. The Soekarno–Hatta International Airport, which serves the area near Indonesia's capital, Jakarta, still uses the Dutch spelling.

Indonesians also remember him as Bung Karno (Brother/Comrade Karno) or Pak Karno ("Mr. Karno"). Like many Javanese people, he had only one name.

He is sometimes referred to in foreign accounts as "Achmed Sukarno", or some variation thereof. The fictitious first name may have been added by Western journalists confused over someone with just a single name, or by Indonesian supporters of independence to attract support from Muslim countries. Source from Ministry of Foreign Affairs later revealed, "Achmed" (later, written as "Ahmad" or "Ahmed" by Arabian states and other foreign state press) was coined by M. Zein Hassan, an Indonesian student at Al-Azhar University and later a member of the staff at the Department of Foreign Affairs, to establish Soekarno's identity as a Muslim to the Egyptian press after a brief controversy at that time in Egypt alleging Sukarno's name was "not Muslim enough". After the use of the name "Achmed" began, Muslim and Arab states freely supported Sukarno. Thus, in correspondence with the Middle East, Sukarno always signed his name as "Achmed Soekarno".

Early life

Early life and education

Early life 

The son of a Javanese primary school teacher, an aristocrat named Raden Soekemi Sosrodihardjo, and his Hindu Balinese wife from the Brahmin family named Ida Ayu Nyoman Rai from Buleleng, Sukarno was born in Surabaya in the Dutch East Indies (now Indonesia), where his father had been sent following an application for a transfer to Java. He was originally named Kusno Sosrodihardjo. Following Javanese custom, he was renamed after surviving a childhood illness.

Education 
After graduating from a native primary school in 1912, he was sent to the Europeesche Lagere School (a Dutch primary school) in Mojokerto. Subsequently, in 1916, Sukarno went to a Hogere Burgerschool (a Dutch type higher level secondary school) in Surabaya, where he met Tjokroaminoto, a nationalist and founder of Sarekat Islam. In 1920, Sukarno married Tjokroaminoto's daughter Siti Oetari. In 1921, he began to study civil engineering (with a focus on architecture) at the Technische Hoogeschool te Bandoeng (Bandoeng Institute of Technology), where he obtained an Ingenieur degree (abbreviated as "Ir.", a Dutch type engineer's degree) in 1926. During his study in Bandung, Sukarno became romantically involved with Inggit Garnasih, the wife of Sanoesi, the owner of the boarding house where he lived as a student. Inggit was 13 years older than Sukarno. In March 1923, Sukarno divorced Siti Oetari to marry Inggit (who also divorced her husband Sanoesi). Sukarno later divorced Inggit and married Fatmawati.

Atypically even among the country's small educated elite, Sukarno was fluent in several languages. In addition to the Javanese language of his childhood, he was a master of Sundanese, Balinese and Indonesian, and was especially strong in Dutch. He was also quite comfortable in German, English, French, Arabic, and Japanese, all of which were taught at his HBS. He was helped by his photographic memory and precocious mind.

In his studies, Sukarno was "intensely modern", both in architecture and in politics. He despised both the traditional Javanese feudalism, which he considered "backward" and to blame for the fall of the country under Dutch occupation and exploitation, and the imperialism practised by Western countries, which he termed as "exploitation of humans by other humans" (exploitation de l'homme par l'homme). He blamed this for the deep poverty and low levels of education of Indonesian people under the Dutch. To promote nationalistic pride amongst Indonesians, Sukarno interpreted these ideas in his dress, in his urban planning for the capital (eventually Jakarta), and in his socialist politics, though he did not extend his taste for modern art to pop music; he had Koes Bersaudara imprisoned for their allegedly decadent lyrics despite his reputation for womanising. For Sukarno, modernity was blind to race, neat and elegant in style, and anti-imperialist.

Architectural career

Sukarno & Anwari firm 
After graduation in 1926, Sukarno and his university friend Anwari established the architectural firm Sukarno & Anwari in Bandung, which provided planning and contractor services. Among Sukarno's architectural works are the renovated building of the Preanger Hotel (1929), where he acted as assistant to famous Dutch architect Charles Prosper Wolff Schoemaker. Sukarno also designed many private houses on today's Jalan Gatot Subroto, Jalan Palasari, and Jalan Dewi Sartika in Bandung. Later on, as president, Sukarno remained engaged in architecture, designing the Proclamation Monument and adjacent Gedung Pola in Jakarta; the Youth Monument (Tugu Muda) in Semarang; the Alun-alun Monument in Malang; the Heroes' Monument in Surabaya; and also the new city of Palangkaraya in Central Kalimantan.

Early independence struggle

Sukarno was first exposed to nationalist ideas while living under Oemar Said Tjokroaminoto. Later, while a student in Bandung, he immersed himself in European, American, Nationalist, communist, and religious political philosophy, eventually developing his own political ideology of Indonesian-style socialist self-sufficiency. He began styling his ideas as Marhaenism, named after Marhaen, an Indonesian peasant he met in southern Bandung area, who owned his little plot of land and worked on it himself, producing sufficient income to support his family. In university, Sukarno began organising a study club for Indonesian students, the Algemeene Studieclub, in opposition to the established student clubs dominated by Dutch students.

Involvement in the Indonesian National Party 
On 4 July 1927, Sukarno with his friends from the Algemeene Studieclub established a pro-independence party, the Indonesian National Party (PNI), of which Sukarno was elected the first leader. The party advocated independence for Indonesia, and opposed imperialism and capitalism because it opined that both systems worsened the life of Indonesian people. The party also advocated secularism and unity amongst the many different ethnicities in the Dutch East Indies, to establish a united Indonesia. Sukarno also hoped that Japan would commence a war against the western powers and that Java could then gain its independence with Japan's aid. Coming soon after the disintegration of Sarekat Islam in the early 1920s and the crushing of the Indonesian Communist Party after its failed rebellion of 1926, the PNI began to attract a large number of followers, particularly among the new university-educated youths eager for broader freedoms and opportunities denied to them in the racist and constrictive political system of Dutch colonialism.

Arrest, trial, and imprisonment

Arrest and trial 

PNI activities came to the attention of the colonial government, and Sukarno's speeches and meetings were often infiltrated and disrupted by agents of the colonial secret police (Politieke Inlichtingen Dienst/PID). Eventually, Sukarno and other key PNI leaders were arrested on 29 December 1929 by Dutch colonial authorities in a series of raids throughout Java. Sukarno himself was arrested while on a visit to Yogyakarta. During his trial at the Bandung Landraad courthouse from August to December 1930, Sukarno made a series of long political speeches attacking colonialism and imperialism, titled Indonesia Menggoegat (Indonesia Accuses).

Sentence and imprisonment 
In December 1930, Sukarno was sentenced to four years in prison, which were served in Sukamiskin prison in Bandung. His speech, however, received extensive coverage by the press, and due to strong pressure from the liberal elements in both Netherlands and Dutch East Indies, Sukarno was released early on 31 December 1931. By this time, he had become a popular hero widely known throughout Indonesia.

However, during his imprisonment, the PNI had been splintered by the oppression of colonial authorities and internal dissension. The original PNI was disbanded by the Dutch, and its former members formed two different parties; the Indonesia Party (Partindo) under Sukarno's associate Sartono who were promoting mass agitation, and the Indonesian Nationalist Education (New PNI) under Mohammad Hatta and Soetan Sjahrir, two nationalists who recently returned from studies in the Netherlands, and who were promoting a long-term strategy of providing modern education to the uneducated Indonesian populace to develop an intellectual elite able to offer effective resistance to Dutch rule. After attempting to reconcile the two parties to establish one united nationalist front, Sukarno chose to become the head of Partindo on 28 July 1932. Partindo had maintained its alignment with Sukarno's own strategy of immediate mass agitation, and Sukarno disagreed with Hatta's long-term cadre-based struggle. Hatta himself believed Indonesian independence would not occur within his lifetime, while Sukarno believed Hatta's strategy ignored the fact that politics can only make real changes through formation and utilisation of force (machtsvorming en machtsaanwending).

During this period, to support himself and the party financially, Sukarno returned to architecture, opening the bureau of Soekarno & Roosseno with his university junior Roosseno. He also wrote articles for the party's newspaper, Fikiran Ra'jat. While based in Bandung, Sukarno travelled extensively throughout Java to establish contacts with other nationalists. His activities attracted further attention by the Dutch PID. In mid-1933, Sukarno published a series of writings titled Mentjapai Indonesia Merdeka ("To Attain Independent Indonesia"). For this writing, he was arrested by Dutch police while visiting fellow nationalist Mohammad Hoesni Thamrin in Jakarta on 1 August 1933.

Exile 
This time, to prevent providing Sukarno with a platform to make political speeches, the hardline governor-general Jonkheer Bonifacius Cornelis de Jonge utilised his emergency powers to send Sukarno to internal exile without trial. In 1934, Sukarno was shipped, along with his family (including Inggit Garnasih), to the remote town of Ende, on the island of Flores. During his time in Flores, he utilised his limited freedom of movement to establish a children's theatre. Among its members was future politician Frans Seda. Due to an outbreak of malaria in Flores, the Dutch authorities decided to move Sukarno and his family to Bencoolen (now Bengkulu) on the western coast of Sumatra, in February 1938.

In Bengkulu, Sukarno became acquainted with Hassan Din, the local head of Muhammadiyah organisation, and he was allowed to teach religious teachings at a local school owned by the Muhammadiyah. One of his students was 15-year-old Fatmawati, daughter of Hassan Din. He became romantically involved with Fatmawati, which he justified by stating the inability of Inggit Garnasih to produce children during their almost 20-year marriage. Sukarno was still in Bengkulu exile when the Japanese invaded the archipelago in 1942.

World War II and the Japanese occupation

Japanese occupation

Background and Invasion 

In early 1929, during the Indonesian National Revival, Sukarno and fellow Indonesian nationalist leader Mohammad Hatta (later Vice President), first foresaw a Pacific War and the opportunity that a Japanese advance on Indonesia might present for the Indonesian independence cause. In February 1942, Imperial Japan invaded the Dutch East Indies quickly defeating Dutch forces who marched, bussed and trucked Sukarno and his entourage three hundred kilometres from Bengkulu to Padang, Sumatra. They intended keeping him prisoner and shipping him to Australia but abruptly abandoned him to save themselves upon the impending approach of Japanese forces on Padang.

Cooperation with the Japanese 

The Japanese had their own files on Sukarno, and the Japanese commander in Sumatra approached him with respect, wanting to use him to organise and pacify the Indonesians. Sukarno, on the other hand, wanted to use the Japanese to gain independence for Indonesia: "The Lord be praised, God showed me the way; in that valley of the Ngarai I said: Yes, Independent Indonesia can only be achieved with Dai Nippon...For the first time in all my life, I saw myself in the mirror of Asia." In July 1942, Sukarno was sent back to Jakarta, where he re-united with other nationalist leaders recently released by the Japanese, including Mohammad Hatta. There, he met the Japanese commander General Hitoshi Imamura, who asked Sukarno and other nationalists to galvanise support from Indonesian populace to aid the Japanese war effort.

Sukarno was willing to support the Japanese, in exchange for a platform for himself to spread nationalist ideas to the mass population. The Japanese, on the other hand, needed Indonesia's workforce and natural resources to help its war effort. The Japanese recruited millions of people, mainly from Java, to be forced labour called "romusha" in Japanese. They were forced to build railways, airfields, and other facilities for the Japanese within Indonesia and as far away as Burma. Additionally, the Japanese requisitioned rice and other food produced by Indonesian peasants to supply their troops, while forcing the peasantry to cultivate castor oil plants to be used as aviation fuel and lubricants.

To gain cooperation from Indonesian population and to prevent resistance to these measures, the Japanese put Sukarno as head of Tiga-A mass organisation movement. In March 1943, the Japanese formed a new organisation called Poesat Tenaga Rakjat (POETERA/ Center of People's Power) under Sukarno, Hatta, Ki Hadjar Dewantara, and KH Mas Mansjoer. These organisations aimed to galvanise popular support for recruitment of romusha, to requisition of food products, and to promote pro-Japanese and anti-Western sentiments amongst Indonesians. Sukarno coined the term, Amerika kita setrika, Inggris kita linggis ("Let's iron America, and bludgeon the British") to promote anti-Allied sentiments. In later years, Sukarno was lastingly ashamed of his role with the romusha. Additionally, food requisitioning by the Japanese caused widespread famine in Java, which killed more than one million people in 1944–1945. In his view, these were necessary sacrifices to be made to allow for the future independence of Indonesia. He also was involved with the formation of Defenders of the Homeland (PETA) and Heiho (Indonesian volunteer army troops) via speeches broadcast on the Japanese radio and loudspeaker networks across Java and Sumatra. By mid-1945 these units numbered around two million and were preparing to defeat any Allied forces sent to re-take Java.

In the meantime, Sukarno eventually divorced Inggit, who refused to accept her husband's wish for polygamy. She was provided with a house in Bandung and a pension for the rest of her life. In 1943, he married Fatmawati. They lived in a house in Jalan Pegangsaan Timur No. 56, confiscated from its previous Dutch owners and presented to Sukarno by the Japanese. This house would later be the venue of the Proclamation of Indonesian Independence in 1945.

On 10 November 1943, Sukarno and Hatta were sent on a 17-day tour of Japan, where they were decorated by Emperor Hirohito and wined and dined in the house of Prime Minister Hideki Tojo in Tokyo. On 7 September 1944, with the war going badly for the Japanese, Prime Minister Kuniaki Koiso promised independence for Indonesia, although no date was set. This announcement was seen, according to the U.S. official history, as immense vindication for Sukarno's apparent collaboration with the Japanese. The U.S. at the time considered Sukarno one of the "foremost collaborationist leaders."

Investigating Committee for Preparatory Work for Independence 

On 29 April 1945, when Philippines liberated by American forces, the Japanese allowed for the establishment of the Investigating Committee for Preparatory Work for Independence (BPUPK), a quasi-legislature consisting of 67 representatives from most ethnic groups in Indonesia. Sukarno was appointed as head of the BPUPK and was tasked to lead discussions to prepare the basis of a future Indonesian state. To provide a common and acceptable platform to unite the various squabbling factions in the BPUPK, Sukarno formulated his ideological thinking developed over the previous twenty years into five principles. On 1 June 1945, he introduced these five principles, known as pancasila, during the joint session of the BPUPK held in the former Volksraad Building (now called the Pancasila Building).

Pancasila, as presented by Sukarno during the BPUPK speech, consisted of five principles which Sukarno saw as commonly shared by all Indonesians:

 Nationalism, whereby a united Indonesian state would stretch from Sabang to Merauke, encompassing all former Dutch East Indies
 Internationalism, meaning Indonesia is to appreciate human rights and contribute to world peace, and should not fall into chauvinistic fascism such as displayed by Nazis with their belief in the racial superiority of Aryans
 Democracy, which Sukarno believed has always been in the blood of Indonesians through the practice of consensus-seeking (musyawarah untuk muafakat), an Indonesian-style democracy different from Western-style liberalism
 Social justice, a form of populist socialism in economics with Marxist-style opposition to free capitalism. Social justice also intended to provide an equal share of the economy to all Indonesians, as opposed to the complete economic domination by the Dutch and Chinese during the colonial period
 Belief in God, whereby all religions are treated equally and have religious freedom. Sukarno saw Indonesians as spiritual and religious people, but in essence tolerant towards different religious beliefs

On 22 June, the Islamic and nationalist elements of the BPUPK created a small committee of nine, which formulated Sukarno's ideas into the five-point Pancasila, in a document known as the Jakarta Charter:

 Belief in one and only Almighty God with obligation for Muslims to adhere to Islamic law
 Civilised and just humanity
 Unity of Indonesia
 Democracy through inner wisdom and representative consensus-building
 Social justice for all Indonesians

Due to pressure from the Islamic element, the first principle mentioned the obligation for Muslims to practice Islamic law (sharia). However, the final Sila as contained in the 1945 Constitution which was put into effect on 18 August 1945, excluded the reference to Islamic law for the sake of national unity. The elimination of sharia was done by Mohammad Hatta based upon a request by Christian representative Alexander Andries Maramis, and after consultation with moderate Islamic representatives Teuku Mohammad Hassan, Kasman Singodimedjo, and Ki Bagoes Hadikoesoemo.

Preparatory Committee for Indonesian Independence 
On 7 August 1945, the Japanese allowed the formation of a smaller Preparatory Committee for Indonesian Independence (PPKI), a 21-person committee tasked with creating the specific governmental structure of the future Indonesian state. On 9 August, the top leaders of PPKI (Sukarno, Hatta, and KRT Radjiman Wediodiningrat), were summoned by Commander-in-Chief of Japan's Southern Expeditionary Forces, Field Marshal Hisaichi Terauchi, to Da Lat, 100 km from Saigon. Field Marshal Terauchi gave Sukarno the freedom to proceed with preparation for Indonesian independence, free of Japanese interference. After much wining and dining, Sukarno's entourage was flown back to Jakarta on 14 August. Unbeknownst to the guests, atomic bombs had been dropped on Hiroshima and Nagasaki, and the Japanese were preparing for surrender.

Japanese surrender 
The following day, on 15 August, the Japanese declared their acceptance of the Potsdam Declaration terms and unconditionally surrendered to the Allies. On the afternoon of that day, Sukarno received this information from leaders of youth groups and members of PETA Chairul Saleh, Soekarni, and Wikana, who had been listening to Western radio broadcasts. They urged Sukarno to declare Indonesian independence immediately, while the Japanese were in confusion and before the arrival of Allied forces. Faced with this quick turn of events, Sukarno procrastinated. He feared bloodbath due to hostile response from the Japanese to such a move and was concerned with prospects of future Allied retribution.

Kidnapping 
At early morning on 16 August, the three youth leaders, impatient with Sukarno's indecision, kidnapped him from his house and brought him to a small house in Rengasdengklok, Karawang, owned by a Chinese family and occupied by PETA. There they gained Sukarno's commitment to declare independence the next day. That night, the youths drove Sukarno back to the house of Admiral Tadashi Maeda, the Japanese naval liaison officer in the Menteng area of Jakarta, who sympathised with Indonesian independence. There, he and his assistant Sajoeti Melik prepared the text of the Proclamation of Indonesian Independence.

Indonesian National Revolution

Proclamation of Indonesian Independence 

In the early morning of 17 August 1945, Sukarno returned to his house at Jalan Pegangsaan Timur No. 56, where Mohammad Hatta joined him. Throughout the morning, impromptu leaflets printed by PETA and youth elements informed the population of the impending proclamation. Finally, at 10 am, Sukarno and Hatta stepped to the front porch, where Sukarno declared the independence of the Republic of Indonesia in front of a crowd of 500 people. This most historic of buildings was later ordered to be demolished by Sukarno himself, without any apparent reason.

On the following day, 18 August, the PPKI declared the basic governmental structure of the new Republic of Indonesia:

 Appointing Sukarno and Mohammad Hatta as president and vice-president and their cabinet.
 Putting into effect the 1945 Indonesian constitution, which by this time excluded any reference to Islamic law.
 Establishing a Central Indonesian National Committee (Komite Nasional Indonesia Poesat/KNIP) to assist the president before an election of a parliament.

Sukarno's vision for the 1945 Indonesian constitution comprised the Pancasila (five principles). Sukarno's political philosophy was mainly a fusion of elements of Marxism, nationalism and Islam. This is reflected in a proposition of his version of Pancasila he proposed to the Investigating Committee for Preparatory Work for Independence (BPUPK) in a speech on 1 June 1945.

Sukarno argued that all of the principles of the nation could be summarised in the phrase gotong royong. The Indonesian parliament, founded on the basis of this original (and subsequently revised) constitution, proved all but ungovernable. This was due to irreconcilable differences between various social, political, religious and ethnic factions.

Revolution and Bersiap 

In the days following the proclamation, the news of Indonesian independence was spread by radio, newspaper, leaflets, and word of mouth despite attempts by the Japanese soldiers to suppress the news. On 19 September, Sukarno addressed a crowd of one million people at the Ikada Field of Jakarta (now part of Merdeka Square) to commemorate one month of independence, indicating the strong level of popular support for the new Republic, at least on Java and Sumatra. In these two islands, the Sukarno government quickly established governmental control while the remaining Japanese mostly retreated to their barracks awaiting the arrival of Allied forces. This period was marked by constant attacks by armed groups on Europeans, Chinese, Christians, native aristocracy and anyone who were perceived to oppose Indonesian independence. The most serious cases were the Social Revolutions in Aceh and North Sumatra, where large numbers of Acehnese and Malay aristocrats were killed by Islamic groups (in Aceh) and communist-led mobs (in North Sumatra), and the "Three Regions Affair" in northwestern coast of Central Java where large numbers of Europeans, Chinese, and native aristocrats were butchered by mobs. These bloody incidents continued until late 1945 to early 1946, and begin to peter out as Republican authorities begin to exert and consolidate control.

Sukarno's government initially postponed the formation of a national army, for fear of antagonizing the Allied occupation forces and their doubt over whether they would have been able to form an adequate military apparatus to maintain control of seized territory. The members of various militia groups formed during Japanese occupation such as the disbanded PETA and Heiho, at that time were encouraged to join the BKR—Badan Keamanan Rakjat (The People's Security Organization)—itself a subordinate of the "War Victims Assistance Organization". It was only in October 1945 that the BKR was reformed into the TKR—Tentara Keamanan Rakjat (The People's Security Army) in response to the increasing Allied and Dutch presence in Indonesia. The TKR armed themselves mostly by attacking Japanese troops and confiscating their weapons.

Due to the sudden transfer of Java and Sumatra from General Douglas MacArthur's American-controlled Southwest Pacific Command to Lord Louis Mountbatten's British-controlled Southeast Asian Command, the first Allied soldiers (1st Battalion of Seaforth Highlanders) did not arrive in Jakarta until late September 1945. British forces began to occupy major Indonesian cities in October 1945. The commander of the British 23rd Division, Lieutenant General Sir Philip Christison, set up command in the former governor-general's palace in Jakarta. Christison stated that he intended to free all Allied prisoners-of-war and to allow the return of Indonesia to its pre-war status, as a colony of Netherlands. The Republican government were willing to cooperate with the release and repatriation of Allied civilians and military POWs, setting-up the Committee for the Repatriation of Japanese and Allied Prisoners of Wars and Internees (Panitia Oeroesan Pengangkoetan Djepang dan APWI/POPDA) for this purpose. POPDA, in cooperation with the British, repatriated more than 70,000 Japanese and Allied POWs and internees by the end of 1946. However, due to the relative weakness of the military of the Republic of Indonesia, Sukarno sought independence by gaining international recognition for his new country rather than engage in battle with British and Dutch military forces.

Sukarno was aware that his history as a Japanese collaborator and his leadership in the Japanese-approved PUTERA during the occupation would make the Western countries distrustful of him. To help gain international recognition as well as to accommodate domestic demands for representation, Sukarno "allowed" the formation of a parliamentary system of government, whereby a prime minister controlled day-to-day affairs of the government, while Sukarno as president remained as a figurehead. The prime minister and his cabinet would be responsible to the Central Indonesian National Committee instead of the president. On 14 November 1945, Sukarno appointed Sutan Sjahrir as first prime minister; he was a European-educated politician who was never involved with the Japanese occupation authorities.

In late 1945 Dutch administrators who led the Dutch East Indies government-in-exile and soldiers who had fought the Japanese began to return under the name of Netherlands Indies Civil Administration (NICA), with the protection of the British. They were led by Hubertus Johannes van Mook, a colonial administrator who had evacuated to Brisbane, Australia. Dutch soldiers who had been POWs under the Japanese were released and rearmed. Shooting between these Dutch soldiers and police supporting the new Republican government Indonesian and civilians soon developed. This soon escalated to armed conflict between the newly constituted Republican forces aided by a myriad of pro-independence mobs and the Dutch and British forces. On 10 November, a full-scale battle broke out in Surabaya between the 49th Infantry Brigade of the British Indian Army and Indonesian nationalist militias. The British-Indian force were supported by air and naval forces. Some 300 Indian soldiers were killed (including their commander Brigadier Aubertin Walter Sothern Mallaby), as were thousands of nationalist militiamen and other Indonesians. Shootouts broke out with alarming regularity in Jakarta, including an attempted assassination of Prime Minister Sjahrir by Dutch gunmen. To avoid this menace, Sukarno and majority of his government left for the safety of Yogyakarta on 4 January 1946. There, the Republican government received protection and full support from Sultan Hamengkubuwono IX. Yogyakarta would remain as the Republic's capital until the end of the war in 1949. Sjahrir remained in Jakarta to conduct negotiations with the British.

The initial series of battles in late 1945 and early 1946 left the British in control of major port cities on Java and Sumatra. During the Japanese occupation, the Outer Islands (excluding Java and Sumatra) were occupied by the Japanese Navy (Kaigun), who did not allow for political mobilisation of the islanders. Consequently, there was little Republican activity in these islands post-proclamation. Australian and Dutch forces were able to quickly take control of these islands without much fighting by the end of 1945 (excluding the resistance of I Gusti Ngurah Rai in Bali, the insurgency in South Sulawesi, and fighting in Hulu Sungai area of South Kalimantan). Meanwhile, the hinterland areas of Java and Sumatra remained under Republican control.

Eager to pull its soldiers out of Indonesia, the British allowed for large-scale infusion of Dutch forces into the country throughout 1946. By November 1946, all British soldiers had been withdrawn from Indonesia. They were replaced with more than 150,000 Dutch soldiers. The British sent Lord Archibald Clark Kerr, 1st Baron Inverchapel and Miles Lampson, 1st Baron Killearn to bring the Dutch and Indonesians to the negotiating table. The result of these negotiations was the Linggadjati Agreement signed in November 1946, where the Dutch acknowledged de facto Republican sovereignty over Java, Sumatra, and Madura. In exchange, the Republicans were willing to discuss a future Commonwealth-like United Kingdom of Netherlands and Indonesia.

Linggadjati Agreement and Operation Product

Linggadjati Agreement 

Sukarno's decision to negotiate with the Dutch was met with strong opposition by various Indonesian factions. Tan Malaka, a communist politician, organised these groups into a united front called the Persatoean Perdjoangan (PP). PP offered a "Minimum Program" which called for complete independence, nationalisation of all foreign properties, and rejection of all negotiations until all foreign troops are withdrawn. These programmes received widespread popular support, including from armed forces commander General Sudirman. On 4 July 1946, military units linked with PP kidnapped Prime Minister Sjahrir who was visiting Yogyakarta. Sjahrir was leading the negotiation with the Dutch. Sukarno, after successfully influencing Sudirman, managed to secure the release of Sjahrir and the arrest of Tan Malaka and other PP leaders. Disapproval of Linggadjati terms within the KNIP led Sukarno to issue a decree doubling KNIP membership by including many pro-agreement appointed members. As a consequence, KNIP ratified the Linggadjati Agreement in March 1947.

Operation Product 
On 21 July 1947, the Linggadjati Agreement was broken by the Dutch, who launched Operatie Product, a massive military invasion into Republican-held territories. Although the newly reconstituted TNI was unable to offer significant military resistance, the blatant violation by the Dutch of an internationally brokered agreement outraged world opinion. International pressure forced the Dutch to halt their invasion force in August 1947. Sjahrir, who has been replaced as prime minister by Amir Sjarifuddin, flew to New York City to appeal Indonesian case in front of United Nations. UN Security Council issued a resolution calling for an immediate ceasefire and appointed a Good Offices Committee (GOC) to oversee the ceasefire. The GOC, based in Jakarta, consisted of delegations from Australia (led by Richard Kirby, chosen by Indonesia), Belgium (led by Paul van Zeeland, chosen by the Netherlands), and United States (led by Frank Porter Graham, neutral).

The Republic was now under firm Dutch military stranglehold, with the Dutch military occupying West Java, and the northern coast of Central Java and East Java, along with the key productive areas of Sumatra. Additionally, the Dutch navy blockaded Republican areas from supplies of vital food, medicine, and weapons. As a consequence, Prime Minister Amir Sjarifuddin had little choice but to sign the Renville Agreement on 17 January 1948, which acknowledged Dutch control over areas taken during Operatie Product, while the Republicans pledged to withdraw all forces that remained on the other side of the ceasefire line ("Van Mook Line"). Meanwhile, the Dutch begin to organise puppet states in the areas under their occupation, to counter Republican influence utilising ethnic diversity of Indonesia.

Renville agreement and Madiun affair 

The signing of highly disadvantageous Renville Agreement caused even greater instability within the Republican political structure. In Dutch-occupied West Java, Darul Islam guerrillas under Sekarmadji Maridjan Kartosuwirjo maintained their anti-Dutch resistance and repealed any loyalty to the Republic; they caused a bloody insurgency in West Java and other areas in the first decades of independence. Prime Minister Sjarifuddin, who signed the agreement, was forced to resign in January 1948 and was replaced by Mohammad Hatta. Hatta cabinet's policy of rationalising the armed forces by demobilising large numbers of armed groups that proliferated the Republican areas also caused severe disaffection. Leftist political elements, led by resurgent Indonesian Communist Party (PKI) under Musso took advantage of public disaffections by launching a rebellion in Madiun, East Java, on 18 September 1948. Bloody fighting continued during late-September until end of October 1948, when the last communist bands were defeated, and Musso shot dead. The communists had overestimated their potential to oppose the strong appeal of Sukarno amongst the population.

Operatie Kraai and exile

Invasion and exile 
On 19 December 1948, to take advantage of the Republic's weak position following the communist rebellion, the Dutch launched Operatie Kraai, a second military invasion designed to crush the Republic once and for all. The invasion was initiated with an airborne assault on Republican capital Yogyakarta. Sukarno ordered the armed forces under Sudirman to launch a guerrilla campaign in the countryside, while he and other key leaders such as Hatta and Sjahrir allowed themselves to be taken prisoner by the Dutch. To ensure continuity of government, Sukarno sent a telegram to Sjafruddin Prawiranegara, providing him with the mandate to lead an Emergency Government of the Republic of Indonesia (PDRI), based on the unoccupied hinterlands of West Sumatra, a position he kept until Sukarno was released in June 1949. The Dutch sent Sukarno and other captured Republican leaders to captivity in Parapat, in Dutch-occupied part of North Sumatra and later to the island of Bangka.

Aftermath 

The second Dutch invasion caused even more international outrage. The United States, impressed by Indonesia's ability to defeat the 1948 communist challenge without outside help, threatened to cut off Marshall Aid funds to the Netherlands if military operations in Indonesia continued. TNI did not disintegrate and continued to wage guerrilla resistance against the Dutch, most notably the assault on Dutch-held Yogyakarta led by Lieutenant-Colonel Suharto on 1 March 1949. Consequently, the Dutch were forced to sign the Roem–Van Roijen Agreement on 7 May 1949. According to this treaty, the Dutch released the Republican leadership and returned the area surrounding Yogyakarta to Republican control in June 1949. This was followed by the Dutch-Indonesian Round Table Conference held in The Hague which led to the complete transfer of sovereignty by the Queen Juliana of the Netherlands to Indonesia, on 27 December 1949. On that day, Sukarno flew from Yogyakarta to Jakarta, making a triumphant speech at the steps of the governor-general's palace, immediately renamed the Merdeka Palace ("Independence Palace").

President of the United States of Indonesia 

At this time, as part of a compromise with the Dutch, Indonesia adopted a new federal constitution that made the country a federal state called the Republic of United States of Indonesia (Indonesian: Republik Indonesia Serikat, RIS), consisting of the Republic of Indonesia whose borders were determined by the "Van Mook Line", along with the six states and nine autonomous territories created by the Dutch. During the first half of 1950, these states gradually dissolved themselves as the Dutch military that previously propped them up was withdrawn. In August 1950, with the last state – the State of East Indonesia – dissolving itself, Sukarno declared a Unitary Republic of Indonesia based on the newly formulated provisional constitution of 1950.

Liberal democracy period (1950–1959) 
Both the Federal Constitution of 1949 and the Provisional Constitution of 1950 were parliamentary in nature, where executive authority laid with the prime minister, and which—on paper—limited presidential power. However, even with his formally reduced role, he commanded a good deal of moral authority as Father of the Nation.

Instability 

The first years of parliamentary democracy proved to be very unstable for Indonesia. Cabinets fell in rapid succession due to the sharp differences between the various political parties within the newly appointed parliament (Dewan Perwakilan Rakjat/DPR). There were severe disagreements on future path of Indonesian state, between nationalists who wanted a Secular state (led by Partai Nasional Indonesia first established by Sukarno), the Islamists who wanted an Islamic state (led by Masyumi Party), and the communists who wanted a Communist state (led by PKI, only allowed to operate again in 1951). On the economic front, there was severe dissatisfaction with continuing economic domination by large Dutch corporations and the ethnic-Chinese.

Darul Islam rebels 
The Darul Islam rebels under Kartosuwirjo in West Java refused to acknowledge Sukarno's authority and declared an NII (Negara Islam Indonesia – Islamic State of Indonesia) in August 1949. Rebellions in support of Darul Islam also broke out in South Sulawesi in 1951, and in Aceh in 1953. Meanwhile, pro-federalism members of the disbanded KNIL launched failed rebellion in Bandung (APRA rebellion of 1950), in Makassar in 1950, and Ambon (Republic of South Maluku revolt of 1950).

Division in the Military 
Additionally, the military was torn by hostilities between officers originating from the colonial-era KNIL, who wished for a small and elite professional military, and the overwhelming majority of soldiers who started their careers in the Japanese-formed PETA, who were afraid of being discharged and were more known for nationalist-zeal over professionalism.

On 17 October 1952, the leaders of the former-KNIL faction, Army Chief Colonel Abdul Haris Nasution and Armed Forces Chief-of-Staff Tahi Bonar Simatupang mobilised their troops in a show of force. Protesting against attempts by the DPR to interfere in military business on behalf of the former PETA faction of the military, Nasution and Simatupang had their troops surround the Merdeka Palace and point their tank turrets at the building. Their demand for Sukarno was that the current DPR be dismissed. For this cause, Nasution and Simatupang also mobilised civilian protesters. Sukarno came out of the palace and convinced both the soldiers and the civilians to go home. Nasution and Simatupang were later dismissed. Nasution, however, would be re-appointed as Army Chief after reconciling with Sukarno in 1955.

1955 legislative elections
The 1955 elections produced a new parliament and a constitutional assembly. The election results showed equal support for the antagonistic powers of the PNI, Masyumi, Nahdlatul Ulama, and PKI parties. With no faction controlling a clear majority, domestic political instability continued unabated. Talks in the Constitutional Assembly to write a new constitution met with deadlock over the issue of whether to include Islamic law.

Sukarno came to resent his figurehead position and the increasing disorder of the country's political life. Claiming that Western-style parliamentary democracy was unsuitable for Indonesia, he called for a system of "guided democracy," which he claimed was based on indigenous principles of governance. Sukarno argued that at the village level, important questions were decided by lengthy deliberation designed to achieve a consensus, under the guidance of village elders. He believed it should be the model for the entire nation, with the president taking the role assumed by village elders. He proposed a government based not only on political parties but on "functional groups" composed of the nation's essential elements, which would together form a National Council, through which a national consensus could express itself under presidential guidance.

Vice President Mohammad Hatta was strongly opposed to Sukarno's guided democracy concept. Citing this and other irreconcilable differences, Hatta resigned from his position in December 1956. His retirement sent a shockwave across Indonesia, particularly among the non-Javanese, who viewed Hatta as their representative in a Javanese-dominated government.

Military takeovers and martial law

Regional military takeovers 
From December 1956 to January 1957, regional military commanders in the provinces of North, Central, and South Sumatra provinces took over local government control. They declared a series of military councils which were to run their respective areas and refused to accept orders from Jakarta. A similar regional military movement took control of North Sulawesi in March 1957. They demanded the elimination of communist influence in government, equal share in government revenues, and reinstatement of the former Sukarno-Hatta duumvirate.

Declaration of martial law 
Faced with this serious challenge to the unity of the republic, Sukarno declared martial law (Staat van Oorlog en Beleg) on 14 March 1957. He appointed a non-partisan prime minister Djuanda Kartawidjaja, while the military was in the hands of his loyal General Nasution. Nasution increasingly shared Sukarno's views on the negative impact of western democracy on Indonesia, and he saw a more significant role for the military in political life.

As a reconciliatory move, Sukarno invited the leaders of the regional councils to Jakarta on 10–14 September 1957, to attend a National Conference (Musjawarah Nasional), which failed to bring a solution to the crisis. On 30 November 1957, an assassination attempt was made on Sukarno by way of a grenade attack while he was visiting a school function in Cikini, Central Jakarta. Six children were killed, but Sukarno did not suffer any serious wounds. The perpetrators were members of the Darul Islam group, under the order of its leader Sekarmadji Maridjan Kartosuwirjo.

By December 1957, Sukarno began to take serious steps to enforce his authority over the country. On that month, he nationalised 246 Dutch companies which had been dominating the Indonesian economy, most notably the Netherlands Trading Society, Royal Dutch Shell subsidiary Bataafsche Petroleum Maatschappij, Escomptobank, and the "big five" Dutch trading corporations (NV Borneo Sumatra Maatschappij / Borsumij, NV Internationale Crediet- en Handelsvereeneging "Rotterdam" / Internatio, NV Jacobson van den Berg & Co, NV Lindeteves-Stokvis, and NV Geo Wehry & Co), and expelled 40,000 Dutch citizens remaining in Indonesia while confiscating their properties, purportedly due to the failure by the Dutch government to continue negotiations on the fate of Netherlands New Guinea as was promised in the 1949 Round Table Conference. Sukarno's policy of economic nationalism was strengthened by the issuance Presidential Directive No. 10 of 1959, which banned commercial activities by foreign nationals in rural areas. This rule targeted ethnic Chinese, who dominated both the rural and urban retail economy, although at this time few of them had Indonesian citizenship. This policy resulted in massive relocation of the rural ethnic-Chinese population to urban areas, and approximately 100,000 chose to return to China.

To face the dissident regional commanders, Sukarno and Army Chief Nasution decided to take drastic steps following the failure of Musjawarah Nasional. By utilizing regional officers that remained loyal to Jakarta, Nasution organised a series of "regional coups" which ousted the dissident commanders in North Sumatra (Colonel Maludin Simbolon) and South Sumatra (Colonel Barlian) by December 1957. This returned government control over key cities of Medan and Palembang.

In February 1958, the remaining dissident commanders in Central Sumatra (Colonel Ahmad Hussein) and North Sulawesi (Colonel Ventje Sumual) declared the PRRI-Permesta Movement aimed at overthrowing the Jakarta government. They were joined by many civilian politicians from the Masyumi Party, such as Sjafruddin Prawiranegara who were opposed to the growing influence of communists. Due to their anti-communist rhetoric, the rebels received money, weapons, and manpower from the CIA in a campaign known as Archipelago. This support ended when Allen Lawrence Pope, an American pilot, was shot down after a bombing raid on government-held Ambon in April 1958. In April 1958, the central government responded by launching airborne and seaborne military invasions on Padang and Manado, the rebel capitals. By the end of 1958, the rebels had been militarily defeated, and the last remaining rebel guerrilla bands surrendered in August 1961.

Guided Democracy period (1959–1966)

The impressive military victories over the PRRI-Permesta rebels and the popular nationalisation of Dutch companies left Sukarno in a firm position. On 5 July 1959, Sukarno reinstated the 1945 constitution by presidential decree. It established a presidential system which he believed would make it easier to implement the principles of guided democracy. He called the system Manifesto Politik or Manipol—but it was actually government by decree. Sukarno envisioned an Indonesian-style socialist society,  adherent to the principle of USDEK:
 Undang-Undang Dasar '45 (Constitution of 1945)
 Sosialisme Indonesia (Indonesian socialism)
 Demokrasi Terpimpin (Guided Democracy)
 Ekonomi Terpimpin (Commanded Economy).
 Kepribadian Indonesia (Indonesia's Identity)

In March 1960, Sukarno disbanded parliament and replaced it with a new parliament where half the members were appointed by the president (Dewan Perwakilan Rakjat – Gotong Rojong / DPR-GR). In September 1960, he established a Provisional People's Consultative Assembly (Madjelis Permusjawaratan Rakjat Sementara/MPRS) as the highest legislative authority according to the 1945 constitution. MPRS members consisted of members of DPR-GR and members of "functional groups" appointed by the president.

With the backing of the military, Sukarno disbanded the Islamic party Masyumi and Sutan Sjahrir's party PSI, accusing them of involvement with PRRI-Permesta affair. The military arrested and imprisoned many of Sukarno's political opponents, from socialist Sjahrir to Islamic politicians Mohammad Natsir and Hamka. Using martial law powers, the government closed-down newspapers who were critical of Sukarno's policies.

During this period, there were several assassination attempts on Sukarno's life. On 9 March 1960, Daniel Maukar, an Indonesian airforce lieutenant who sympathised with the Permesta rebellion, strafed the Merdeka Palace and Bogor Palace with his MiG-17 fighter jet, attempting to kill the president; he was not injured. In May 1962, Darul Islam agents shot at the president during Eid al-Adha prayers on the grounds of the palace. Sukarno again escaped injury.

On the security front, the military started a series of effective campaigns which ended the long-festering Darul Islam rebellion in West Java (1962), Aceh (1962), and South Sulawesi (1965). Kartosuwirjo, the leader of Darul Islam, was captured and executed in September 1962.

To counterbalance the power of the military, Sukarno started to rely on the support of the Communist Party of Indonesia (PKI). In 1960, he declared his government to be based on Nasakom, a union of the three ideological strands present in Indonesian society: nasionalisme (nationalism), agama (religions), and komunisme (communism). Accordingly, Sukarno started admitting more communists into his government, while developing a strong relationship with the PKI chairman Dipa Nusantara Aidit.

In order to increase Indonesia's prestige, Sukarno supported and won the bid for the 1962 Asian Games held in Jakarta. Many sporting facilities such as the Senayan sports complex (including the 100,000-seat Bung Karno Stadium) were built to accommodate the games. There was political tension when the Indonesians refused the entry of delegations from Israel and Taiwan. After the International Olympic Committee imposed sanctions on Indonesia due to this exclusion policy, Sukarno retaliated by organising a "non-imperialist" competitor event to the Olympic Games, called the Games of New Emerging Forces (GANEFO). GANEFO was successfully held in Jakarta in November 1963 and was attended by 2,700 athletes from 51 countries.

As part of his prestige-building program, Sukarno ordered the construction of large monumental buildings such as National Monument (Monumen Nasional), Istiqlal Mosque, Jakarta, CONEFO Building (now the Parliament Building), Hotel Indonesia, and the Sarinah shopping centre to transform Jakarta from a former colonial backwater to a modern city. The modern Jakarta boulevards of Jalan Thamrin, Jalan Sudirman, and Jalan Gatot Subroto were planned and constructed under Sukarno.

Foreign policy

Bandung conference 
On the international front, Sukarno organised the Bandung Conference in 1955, with the goal of uniting the developing Asian and African countries into the Non-Aligned Movement to counter both the United States and the Soviet Union.

Cold War 

As Sukarno's domestic authority was secured, he began to pay more attention to the world stage. He embarked on a series of aggressive and assertive policies based on anti-imperialism to increase Indonesia's international prestige. These anti-imperialist and anti-Western policies, often employing brinkmanship with other nations, were also designed to unite the diverse and fractious Indonesian people. In this, he was aided by his Foreign Minister Subandrio.

After his first visit to Beijing in 1956, Sukarno began to strengthen his ties to the People's Republic of China and the communist bloc in general. He also began to accept increasing amounts of Soviet-bloc military aid. By the early 1960s, the Soviet bloc provided more aid to Indonesia than to any other non-communist country, while Soviet military aid to Indonesia was equalled only by its aid to Cuba. This substantial influx of communist aid prompted an increase in military aid from the Dwight Eisenhower and John F. Kennedy Administrations, which worried about a leftward drift should Sukarno rely too much on Soviet-bloc aid.

Sukarno was feted during his visit to the United States in 1956, where he addressed a joint session of the United States Congress. To date, it is the only time any Indonesian President has addressed a joint session of the U.S. Congress. Soon after his first visit to America, Sukarno visited the Soviet Union, where he received a more lavish welcome. Soviet Premier Nikita Khrushchev paid a return visit to Jakarta and Bali in 1960, where he awarded Sukarno with the Lenin Peace Prize. To make amends for CIA involvement in the PRRI-Permesta rebellion, U.S. President Kennedy invited Sukarno to Washington, D.C. and provided Indonesia with billions of dollars in civilian and military aid.

To follow up on the successful 1955 Bandung Conference, Sukarno attempted to forge a new alliance called the "New Emerging Forces" (NEFO), as a counter to the Western superpowers dubbed the "Old Established Forces" (OLDEFO), whom he accused of spreading "Neo-Colonialism and Imperialism" (NEKOLIM). In 1961, Sukarno established another political alliance, called the Non-Aligned Movement (NAM, in Indonesia known as Gerakan Non-Blok, GNB) with Egypt's President Gamal Abdel Nasser, India's Prime Minister Pandit Jawaharlal Nehru, Yugoslavia's President Josip Broz Tito, and Ghana's President Kwame Nkrumah, in an action called The Initiative of Five (Sukarno, Nkrumah, Nasser, Tito, and Nehru). NAM was intended to provide political unity and influence for nations who wished to maintain independence from the American and Soviet superpower blocs, which were engaged in Cold War competition. Sukarno is still fondly remembered for his role in promoting the influence of newly independent countries. His name is used as a street name in Cairo, Egypt and Rabat, Morocco, and as a major square in Peshawar, Pakistan. In 1956, the University of Belgrade awarded him an honorary doctorate.

Papua conflict 

In 1960 Sukarno began an aggressive foreign policy to secure Indonesian territorial claims. In August of that year, Sukarno broke off diplomatic relations with the Netherlands over the continuing failure to commence talks on the future of Netherlands New Guinea, as was agreed at the Dutch-Indonesian Round Table Conference of 1949. In April 1961, the Dutch announced the formation of a Nieuw Guinea Raad, intending to create an independent Papuan state. Sukarno declared a state of military confrontation in his Tri Komando Rakjat (TRIKORA) speech in Yogyakarta, on 19 December 1961. He then directed military incursions into the half-island, which he referred to as West Irian. By the end of 1962, 3,000 Indonesian soldiers were present throughout West Irian/West Papua.

A naval battle erupted in January 1962 when four Indonesian torpedo boats were intercepted by Dutch ships and planes off the coast of Vlakke Hoek. One Indonesian boat was sunk, killing the Naval Deputy Chief-of-Staff Commodore Jos Sudarso. Meanwhile, the Kennedy Administration worried of a continuing Indonesian shift towards communism should the Dutch hold on to West Irian/West Papua. In February 1962 U.S. Attorney General Robert F. Kennedy travelled to the Netherlands and informed the government that the United States would not support the Netherlands in an armed conflict with Indonesia. With Soviet armaments and advisors, Sukarno planned a large-scale air- and seaborne invasion of the Dutch military headquarters of Biak for August 1962, called Operasi Djajawidjaja. It was to be led by Major-General Suharto, the future President of Indonesia. Before these plans could be realised, Indonesia and the Netherlands signed the New York Agreement in August 1962. The two countries agreed to implement the Bunker Plan (formulated by American diplomat Ellsworth Bunker), whereby the Dutch agreed to hand over West Irian/West Papua to UNTEA on 1 October 1962. UNTEA transferred the territory to Indonesian authority in May 1963.

Konfrontasi 

After securing control over West Irian/West Papua, Sukarno then opposed the British-supported establishment of the Federation of Malaysia in 1963, claiming that it was a neo-colonial plot by the British to undermine Indonesia. Despite Sukarno's political overtures, which found some support when leftist political elements in British Borneo territories Sarawak and Brunei opposed the Federation plan and aligned themselves with Sukarno, Malaysia was established in September 1963. This was followed by the Indonesia–Malaysia confrontation (Konfrontasi), proclaimed by Sukarno in his Dwi Komando Rakjat (DWIKORA) speech in Jakarta on 3 May 1964. Sukarno's proclaimed objective was not, as some alleged, to annex Sabah and Sarawak into Indonesia, but to establish a "State of North Kalimantan" under the control of North Kalimantan Communist Party. From 1964 until early 1966, a limited number of Indonesian soldiers, civilians, and Malaysian communist guerrillas were sent into North Borneo and the Malay Peninsula. These forces fought against British and Commonwealth soldiers deployed to protect the nascent state of Malaysia. Indonesian agents also exploded several bombs in Singapore. Domestically, Sukarno fomented anti-British sentiment, and the British Embassy was burned down. In 1964, all British companies operating in the country, including Indonesian operations of the Chartered Bank and Unilever, were nationalised. The confrontation came to a climax during August 1964, when Sukarno authorised landings of Indonesian troops at Pontian and Labis on the Malaysian mainland, and all-out war seemed inevitable as tensions escalated. However, the situation calmed by mid-September at the culmination of the Sunda Straits Crisis, and after the disastrous Battle of Plaman Mapu in April 1965, Indonesian raids into Sarawak became fewer and weaker.

In 1964, Sukarno commenced an anti-American campaign, which was motivated by his shift towards the communist bloc and less friendly relations with the Lyndon Johnson administration. American interests and businesses in Indonesia were denounced by government officials and attacked by PKI-led mobs. American movies were banned, American books and Beatles albums were burned, and the Indonesian band Koes Plus was jailed for playing American-style rock and roll music. As a result, U.S. aid to Indonesia was halted, to which Sukarno made his famous remark, "Go to hell with your aid". Sukarno withdrew Indonesia from the United Nations on 7 January 1965 when, with U.S. backing, Malaysia took a seat on UN Security Council.

Conference of New Emerging Forces 
As the NAM countries were becoming split into different factions, and as fewer countries were willing to support his anti-Western foreign policies, Sukarno began to abandon his non-alignment rhetoric. Sukarno formed a new alliance with China, North Korea, North Vietnam, and Cambodia which he called the "Beijing-Pyongyang-Hanoi-Phnom Penh-Jakarta Axis". After withdrawing Indonesia from the "imperialist-dominated" United Nations in January 1965, Sukarno sought to establish a competitor organisation to the UN called the Conference of New Emerging Forces (CONEFO) with support from the People's Republic of China, which at that time was not yet a member of United Nations. With the government heavily indebted to the Soviet Union, Indonesia became increasingly dependent on China for support. Sukarno spoke increasingly of a Beijing-Jakarta axis, which would be the core of a new anti-imperialist world organisation, the CONEFO.

Domestic policy

President for life and Cult of personality 
Domestically, Sukarno continued to consolidate his control. He was made president for life by the MPRS in 1963. His ideological writings on Manipol-USDEK and NASAKOM became mandatory subjects in Indonesian schools and universities, while his speeches were to be memorised and discussed by all students. All newspapers, the only radio station (RRI, government-run), and the only television station (TVRI, also government-run) were made into "tools of the revolution" and functioned to spread Sukarno's messages. Sukarno developed a personality cult, with the capital of newly acquired West Irian renamed to Sukarnapura and the highest peak in the country was renamed from Carstensz Pyramid to Puntjak Sukarno (Sukarno Peak).

Rise of the PKI 
Despite these appearances of unchallenged control, Sukarno's guided democracy stood on fragile grounds due to the inherent conflict between its two underlying support pillars, the military and the communists. The military, nationalists, and the Islamic groups were shocked by the rapid growth of the communist party under Sukarno's protection. They feared an imminent establishment of a communist state in Indonesia. By 1965, the PKI had three million members and were particularly strong in Central Java and Bali. The PKI had become the strongest party in Indonesia.

The military and nationalists were growing wary of Sukarno's close alliance with communist China, which they thought compromised Indonesia's sovereignty. Elements of the military disagreed with Sukarno's policy of confrontation with Malaysia, which in their view only benefited communists, and sent several officers (including future Armed Forces Chief Leonardus Benjamin Moerdani) to spread secret peace-feelers to the Malaysian government. The Islamic clerics, who were mostly landowners, felt threatened by PKI's land confiscation actions (aksi sepihak) in the countryside and by the communist campaign against the "seven village devils", a term used for landlords or better-off farmers (similar to the anti-kulak campaign in Stalinist era). Both groups harboured deep disdain for PKI in particular due to memories of the bloody 1948 communist rebellion.

As the mediator of the three groups under the NASAKOM system, Sukarno displayed greater sympathies to the communists. The PKI had been very careful to support all of Sukarno's policies. Meanwhile, Sukarno saw the PKI as the best-organised and ideologically solid party in Indonesia, and a useful conduit to gain more military and financial aid from Communist Bloc countries. Sukarno also sympathised with the communists' revolutionary ideals, which were similar to his own.

To weaken the influence of the military, Sukarno rescinded martial law (which gave wide-ranging powers to the military) in 1963. In September 1962, he "promoted" the powerful General Nasution to the less-influential position of Armed Forces Chief, while the influential position of Army Chief was given to Sukarno's loyalist Ahmad Yani. Meanwhile, the position of Air Force Chief was given to Omar Dhani, who was an open communist sympathiser. In May 1964, Sukarno banned activities of Manifesto Kebudajaan (Manikebu), an association of artists and writers which included prominent Indonesian writers such as Hans Bague Jassin and Wiratmo Soekito, who were also dismissed from their jobs. Manikebu was considered a rival by the communist writer's association Lembaga Kebudajaan Rakjat (Lekra), led by Pramoedya Ananta Toer. In December 1964, Sukarno disbanded the Badan Pendukung Soekarnoisme (BPS), the "Association for Promoting Sukarnoism", an organisation that seeks to oppose communism by invoking Sukarno's own Pancasila formulation. In January 1965, Sukarno, under pressure from PKI, banned the Murba Party. Murba was a pro-Soviet Union party whose ideology was antagonistic to PKI's pro-Chinese People's Republic view of Marxism.

Tensions between the military and communists increased in April 1965, when PKI chairman Aidit called for the formation of a "fifth armed force" consisting of armed peasants and labour. Sukarno approved this idea and publicly called for the immediate formation of such a force on 17 May 1965. However, Army Chief Ahmad Yani and Defence Minister Nasution procrastinated in implementing this idea, as this was tantamount to allowing the PKI to establish its own armed forces. Soon afterwards, on 29 May, the "Gilchrist Letter" appeared. The letter was supposedly written by the British ambassador Andrew Gilchrist to the Foreign Office in London, mentioning a joint American and British attempt on subversion in Indonesia with the help of "local army friends". This letter, produced by Subandrio, aroused Sukarno's fear of a military plot to overthrow him, a fear which he repeatedly mentioned during the next few months. The Czechoslovakian agent Ladislav Bittman who defected in 1968 claimed that his agency (StB) forged the letter on request from PKI via the Soviet Union, to smear anti-communist generals. On his independence day speech of 17 August 1965, Sukarno declared his intention to commit Indonesia to an anti-imperialist alliance with China and other communist regimes and warned the Army not to interfere. He also stated his support for the establishment of a "fifth force" of armed peasants and labour.

Economic decline
While Sukarno devoted his energy to domestic and international politics, the economy of Indonesia was neglected and deteriorated rapidly. The government printed money to finance its military expenditures, resulting in hyperinflation exceeding 600% per annum in 1964–1965. Smuggling and the collapse of export plantation sectors deprived the government of much-needed foreign exchange income. Consequently, the government was unable to service massive foreign debts it had accumulated from both Western and Communist bloc countries.  Most of the government budget was spent on the military, resulting in deterioration of infrastructures such as roads, railways, ports, and other public facilities. Deteriorating transportation infrastructure and poor harvests caused food shortages in many places. The small industrial sector languished and only produced at 20% capacity due to lack of investment.

Sukarno himself was contemptuous of macroeconomics and was unable and unwilling to provide practical solutions to the poor economic condition of the country. Instead, he produced more ideological conceptions such as Trisakti: political sovereignty, economic self-sufficiency, and cultural independence. He advocated Indonesians "standing on their own feet" (Berdikari) and achieving economic self-sufficiency, free from foreign influence.

Towards the end of his rule, Sukarno's lack of interest in economics created a distance between himself and the Indonesian people, who were suffering economically. His face had become bloated by disease, and his flamboyance and sexual conquests – which had once endeared him to the people – caused public criticism and turned support towards the army.

Removal from power, death and after

30 September Movement

Kidnappings and murders 
On the dawn of 1 October 1965, six of Indonesia's most senior army generals were kidnapped and murdered by a movement calling themselves the "30 September Movement" (G30S). Among those killed was Ahmad Yani, while Nasution narrowly escaped, but the movement kidnapped First Lieutenant Pierre Tendean, his adjutant, presumably mistaking him for General Nasution in the darkness.  The G30S consisted of members of the Presidential Guards, Brawidjaja Division, and Diponegoro Division, under the command of a Lieutenant-Colonel Untung bin Sjamsuri. The movement took control of the RRI radio station and Merdeka Square. They broadcast a statement declaring the kidnappings were meant to protect Sukarno from a coup attempt by CIA-influenced generals. Later, it broadcast news of the disbandment of Sukarno's cabinet, to be replaced by a "Revolutionary Council". In Central Java, soldiers associated with the G30S also seized control of Yogyakarta and Solo on 1–2 October, killing two colonels in the process.

The end of the movement 
Major General Suharto, commander of the military's strategic reserve command, took control of the army the following morning. Suharto ordered troops to take over the RRI radio station and Merdeka Square itself. On the afternoon of that day, Suharto issued an ultimatum to the Halim Air Force Base, where the G30S had based themselves and where Sukarno (the reasons for his presence are unclear and were subject of claim and counter-claim), Air Marshal Omar Dhani, and PKI chairman Aidit had gathered. By the following day, it was clear that the incompetently organised and poorly coordinated coup had failed. Sukarno took up residence in the Bogor Palace, while Omar Dhani fled to East Java and Aidit to Central Java. By 2 October, Suharto's soldiers occupied Halim Air Force Base, after a short gunfight. Sukarno's obedience to Suharto's 1 October ultimatum to leave Halim is seen as changing all power relationships. Sukarno's fragile balance of power between the military, political Islam, communists, and nationalists that underlay his "Guided Democracy" was now collapsing. On 3 October, the corpses of the kidnapped generals were discovered near the Halim Air Force Base, and on 5 October they were buried in a public ceremony led by Suharto.

Aftermath of the movement 
In early October 1965, a military propaganda campaign began to sweep the country, successfully convincing both Indonesian and international audiences that it was a Communist coup, and that the murders were cowardly atrocities against Indonesian heroes since those who were shot were veteran military officers. PKI's denials of involvement had little effect. Following the discovery and public burial of the generals' corpses on 5 October, the army along with Islamic organisations Muhammadiyah and Nahdlatul Ulama led a campaign to purge Indonesian society, government and armed forces of the communist party and other leftist organisations. Leading PKI members were immediately arrested, some summarily executed. Aidit was captured and killed in November 1965. The purge spread across the country with the worst massacres in Java and Bali. In some areas, the army organised civilian groups and local militias, in other areas communal vigilante action preceded the army. The most widely accepted estimates are that at least half a million were killed. It is thought that as many as 1.5 million were imprisoned at one stage or another.

As a result of the purge, one of Sukarno's three pillars of support, the Indonesian Communist Party, had been effectively eliminated by the other two, the military and political Islam. The killings and the failure of his tenuous "revolution" distressed Sukarno, and he tried unsuccessfully to protect the PKI by referring to the generals' killings as een rimpeltje in de oceaan ("ripple in the sea of the revolution"). He tried to maintain his influence appealing in a January 1966 broadcast for the country to follow him. Subandrio sought to create a Sukarnoist column (Barisan Sukarno), which was undermined by Suharto's pledge of loyalty to Sukarno and the concurrent instruction for all those loyal to Sukarno to announce their support for the army.

Transition to the New Order 

On 1 October 1965, Sukarno appointed General Pranoto Reksosamudro as Army Chief to replace the dead Ahmad Yani, but he was forced to give this position to Suharto two weeks later. In February 1966, Sukarno reshuffled his cabinet, sacking Nasution as Defence Minister and abolishing his position of armed forces chief of staff, but Nasution refused to step down. Beginning in January 1966, university students started demonstrating against Sukarno, demanding the disbandment of PKI and for the government to control spiralling inflation. In February 1966, student demonstrators in front of Merdeka Palace were shot at by Presidential Guards, killing the student Arief Rachman Hakim, who was quickly turned into a martyr by student demonstrators.

Supersemar 

A meeting of Sukarno's full cabinet was held at the Merdeka Palace on 11 March 1966. As students were demonstrating against the administration, unidentified troops began to assemble outside. Sukarno, Subandrio and another minister immediately left the meeting and went to the Bogor Palace by helicopter. Three pro-Suharto generals (Basuki Rahmat, Amirmachmud, and Mohammad Jusuf) were dispatched to the Bogor palace, and they met with Sukarno who signed for them a Presidential Order known as Supersemar. Through the order, Sukarno assigned Suharto to "take all measures considered necessary to guarantee security, calm and stability of the government and the revolution and to guarantee the personal safety and authority [of Sukarno]". The authorship of the document, and whether Sukarno was forced to sign, perhaps even at gunpoint, is a point of historical debate. The effect of the order, however, was the transfer of authority to Suharto. After obtaining the Presidential Order, Suharto had the PKI declared illegal, and the party was abolished.  He also arrested many high-ranking officials that were loyal to Sukarno on the charge of being PKI members and/or sympathisers, further reducing Sukarno's political power and influence.

House arrest and death 

On 22 June 1966, Sukarno made his Nawaksara speech in front of the MPRS, now purged of communist and pro-Sukarno elements, in an unsuccessful last-ditch attempt to defend himself and his guided democracy system. In August 1966, over Sukarno's objections, Indonesia ended its confrontation with Malaysia and rejoined the United Nations. After making another unsuccessful accountability speech (Nawaksara Addendum) on 10 January 1967, Sukarno was stripped of his president-for-life title by MPRS on 12 March 1967, in a session chaired by his former ally, Nasution. On the same day, the MPR named Suharto acting president. Sukarno was put under house arrest in Wisma Yaso (now the Satriamandala Museum), where his health deteriorated due to denial of adequate medical care. He died of kidney failure in Jakarta Army Hospital on 21 June 1970, at the age of 69. He was buried in Blitar, East Java, Indonesia.

Personal life

Family

Marriages 

Sukarno was of Javanese and Balinese descent. He married Siti Oetari in 1921, and divorced her in 1923 to marry Inggit Garnasih, whom he divorced c. 1943 to marry Fatmawati. In 1954, Sukarno married Hartini, a 30-year-old widow from Salatiga, whom he met during a reception. Fatmawati was outraged by this fourth marriage and left Sukarno and their children, although they never officially divorced. In 1959, he was introduced to the then 19-year-old Japanese hostess Naoko Nemoto, whom he married in 1962 and renamed Ratna Dewi Sukarno. Sukarno also had four other spouses: Haryati (1963–66); Kartini Manoppo (1959–68); Yurike Sanger (1964–68); Heldy Djafar (1966–69).

Children 
Megawati Sukarnoputri, who served as the fifth president of Indonesia, is his daughter by his wife Fatmawati. Her younger brother Guruh Sukarnoputra (born 1953) has inherited Sukarno's artistic bent and is a choreographer and songwriter, who made a movie Untukmu, Indonesiaku (For You, My Indonesia) about Indonesian culture. He is also a member of the Indonesian People's Representative Council for Megawati's Indonesian Democratic Party – Struggle. His siblings Guntur Sukarnoputra, Rachmawati Sukarnoputri and Sukmawati Sukarnoputri have all been active in politics. Sukarno had a daughter named Kartika by Dewi Sukarno.  In 2006 Kartika Sukarno married Frits Seegers, the Netherlands-born chief executive officer of the Barclays Global Retail and Commercial Bank. Other children include Taufan and Bayu by his wife Hartini, and a son named Totok Suryawan Sukarnoputra (born 1967, in Germany), by his wife Kartini Manoppo.

Honours
Sukarno was awarded twenty-six honorary doctorates from various international universities including Columbia University, the University of Michigan, the University of Berlin, the Al-Azhar University, the University of Belgrade, the Lomonosov University and many more, and also from domestic universities including Gadjah Mada University, the University of Indonesia, the Bandung Institute of Technology, Hasanuddin University, and Padjadjaran University. He was often referred to by the Indonesian government at the time as 'Dr. Ir. Sukarno', combined with his degree in civil engineering (Ir.) from Bandung Institute of Technology.

National honours
:
  Star of the Republic of Indonesia Adipurna (1st Class)
  Star of Mahaputera Adipurna (1st Class)
  The Sacred Star
  Military Distinguished Service Star
  Guerrilla Star
  Star of Service Utama (1st Class)
  National Police Meritorious Service Star Utama (1st Class)
  Garuda Star
  Armed Forces Eight Years’ Service Star
  Independence Freedom Fighters Medal

Foreign honours
:
 Collar of the Order of the Supreme Sun
: 
 Collar of the Order of the Liberator General San Martin
:
 Medal of the Order of Australia
: 
 Grand Cross of the Order of the Condor of the Andes
: 
 Grand Cross of the Order of the Southern Cross
 Bulgaria: 
 Order of Georgi Dimitrov
: 
 Collar of the Order of the White Lion
: 
 Grand Cross 1st Class of the Order of Merit of the Federal Republic of Germany
:
 Knight of the Order of the Golden Spur
 Knight Grand Cross of the Order of Pope Pius IX
 Recipient of the Benemerenti Medal
:
 Grand Cross with Chain of the Order of Merit of the Republic of Hungary
: 
 Grand Cordon of the Supreme Order of the Chrysanthemum
:
 Grand Cordon of the Order of the Throne
: 
 Chief Commander of the Philippine Legion of Honor
: 
 Grand Cross of the Military Order of Saint James of the Sword
: 
 Supreme Companion of the Order of the Companions of O.R. Tambo
: 
 Order of Lenin
 Lenin Peace Prize
: 
 Knight Grand Cross (First Class) of the Order of Chula Chom Klao
:
 Resistance Medal, 1st Class
: 
 Great Star of the Order of the Yugoslav Star

Works
 Nationalism, Islam and Marxism. Translated by Karel H. Warouw and Peter D. Weldon. Modern Indonesia Project, Ithaca, New York 1970. (On his political concept "Nasakom"; collected of articles, 1926).
 Indonesia vs Fasisme. Pen. Media Pressindo, Yogyakarta 2000. (Political analysis on indonesian nationalism versus fascism; collected of articles 1941).

In popular culture

Books
 Kuantar Ke Gerbang, an Indonesian novel by Ramadhan KH, tells the story of romantic relationship between Sukarno and Inggit Garnasih, his second wife.
 Sukarno – An Autobiography by Cindy Adams, (Bobbs-Merrill, 1965) : "Autobiography" written by an American writer with the cooperation of Sukarno. Translated into Indonesian by Abdul Bar Salim as Bung Karno: Penjambung Lidah Rakjat Indonesia (Gunung Agung, 1966)
 My Friend the Dictator by Cindy Adams, (Bobbs-Merrill, 1965): A contemporary account of the writing of the autobiography

Songs
 A song titled "Untuk Paduka Jang Mulia Presiden Sukarno" (To His Excellency President Sukarno) was written in early 60s by Soetedjo and popularised by Lilis Suryani, a famous Indonesian female soloist. The lyrics are full with expression of praise and gratitude to the then President-for-life.

Movies
 Filipino actor Mike Emperio portrayed Sukarno in the 1982 movie The Year of Living Dangerously directed by Peter Weir as adapted from a novel of same name written by Christopher Koch.
 Indonesian sociologist and writer Umar Kayam portrayed Sukarno in the two 1982 movies Pengkhianatan G 30 S/PKI and Djakarta 66 directed by Arifin C. Noer.
 Indonesian actor Frans Tumbuan portrayed Sukarno in the 1997 movie Blanco, The Colour of Love (compacted from its original TV serial version, Api Cinta Antonio Blanco) about Spanish painter Antonio Blanco who settled and resided in Bali, Indonesia.
 Indonesian actor Soultan Saladin portrayed Sukarno in the 2005 movie Gie, directed by Riri Riza, about the life of student activist Soe Hok Gie.
 Indonesian actor Tio Pakusadewo is set to portray Sukarno in a planned movie 9 Reasons, telling the stories of nine women in the life of the founding father: Oetari (portrayed by Yuki Kato); Inggit Garnasih (Happy Salma); Fatmawati (Revalina Sayuthi Temat); Hartini (Lola Amaria); Haryati; Kartini Manoppo (Wulan Guritno); Ratna Sari Dewi (Mariana Renata); and Yurike Sanger (Isyana Sarasvati). Uniquely, Tio Pakusadewo also has portrayed Sukarno's erstwhile colleague and eventual successor, Suharto, in another 2012 historical biopic, Habibie dan Ainun.
 Indonesian actor Ario Bayu portrayed Sukarno in the 2013 movie Soekarno: Indonesia Merdeka directed by Hanung Bramantyo, about his life from birth until Indonesian independence from Japanese occupation.
 Indonesian actor Baim Wong portrayed Sukarno in the 2013 movie Ketika Bung di Ende, focusing on time and life of Sukarno during his exile in Ende, Flores Island.
 Indonesian actor and TV-personality Dave Mahendra portrayed Sukarno in the 2015 movie Guru Bangsa: Tjokroaminoto, a biopic of Oemar Said Tjokroaminoto, an Indonesian nationalist who is often credited as mentor to many prominent figures in the nation's fight to independence, including Sukarno himself.

See also

 Asian-African Conference
 History of Indonesia
 Withdrawal of Indonesia from UN
 Cold War in Asia#Indonesia

Notes

References

Bibliography
 Bob Hering, 2001, Soekarno, architect of a nation, 1901–1970, KIT Publishers Amsterdam, KITLV Leiden, 
 Jones, Matthew.  "US relations with Indonesia, the Kennedy-Johnson transition, and the Vietnam connection, 1963–1965." Diplomatic History 26.2 (2002): 249–281. online
 Brands, H. W. "The limits of Manipulation: How the United States didn't topple Koesno Sosrodihardjo ." Journal of American History 76.3 (1989): 785–808. online
 Hughes, John (2002), The End of Sukarno – A Coup that Misfired: A Purge that Ran Wild, Archipelago Press, 
 Oei Tjoe Tat, 1995, Memoar Oei Tjoe Tat: Pembantu Presiden Soekarno (The memoir of Oei Tjoe Tat, assistant to President Sukarno), Hasta Mitra,  (banned in Indonesia)
 Lambert J. Giebels, 1999, Soekarno. Nederlandsch onderdaan. Biografie 1901–1950. Biography part 1, Bert Bakker Amsterdam, 
 Lambert J. Giebels, 2001, Soekarno. President, 1950–1970, Biography part 2, Bert Bakker Amsterdam,  geb.,  pbk.
 Lambert J. Giebels, 2005, De stille genocide: de fatale gebeurtenissen rond de val van de Indonesische president Soekarno, 
 
 
 Panitia Nasional Penyelenggara Peringatan HUT Kemerdekaan RI ke-XXX (National Committee on 30th Indonesian Independence Anniversary), 1979, 30 Tahun Indonesia Merdeka (I: 1945–1949) (30 Years of Independent Indonesia (Part I:1945–1949)), Tira Pustaka, Jakarta

External links

 WWW-VL WWW-VL History: Indonesia—Extensive list of online reading on Sukarno
 The Official U.S. position on released CIA documents
 

|-

 
1901 births
1970 deaths
Articles containing video clips
Balinese people
Bandung Institute of Technology alumni
Collars of the Order of the White Lion
Deaths from kidney failure
Dutch political prisoners
Grand Crosses Special Class of the Order of Merit of the Federal Republic of Germany
Heads of government who were later imprisoned
Indonesian collaborators with Imperial Japan
Indonesian independence activists
Indonesian Muslims
Indonesian National Awakening
Indonesian nationalists
Indonesian revolutionaries
Indonesian socialists
Indonesian people who died in prison custody
Javanese people
Leaders ousted by a coup
Lenin Peace Prize recipients
Members of the Central Advisory Council
Muslim socialists
National Heroes of Indonesia
People from Blitar
People from Surabaya
People of the Indonesian National Revolution
Politicians from East Java
Presidents for life
Presidents of Indonesia
Recipients of the Order of the Companions of O. R. Tambo
Recipients of the Order of the Sacred Treasure, 4th class
Sukarno family
Prisoners who died in Indonesian detention